Myntra launched its first digital reality show "Myntra Fashion Superstar" which is based on the fashion influencer talent hunt on Myntra app on 17 September 2019. In association with Zoom Studios, this show will identify & reward India’s next big fashion influencer. Show has eight episodes of reality series which will see 10 contenders competing with each other. They would also be mentored and judged by a star studded jury, from the world of Bollywood, TV and fashion, including Bollywood diva Sonakshi Sinha and leading celebrity stylist, Shaleena Nathani.

The show has been renewed for its second season in association with MTV India and Voot, with Manish Malhotra as the new host.

Judges & Host

Series Details

Season 1

Influencer Contestants

Summary 

   The contestant won Myntra Fashion Superstar.
  The contestant was the runner-up.
  The contestants were eliminated during the final round by the votes of the Myntra Insiders.
  The contestant was voted Myntra Fashion Superstar People's Choice Award by viewers.
  The contestant won the challenge and received a heart from Sonakshi Sinha.
  The contestant received positive judges' critiques and received a heart from Sonakshi Sinha.
  The contestant received negative judges' critiques and was saved by Guest Judge.
  The contestant was in the bottom 2.
  The contestant was eliminated.

Season 2 
The entries for season 2 was announced on 15 August 2020 on MTV India and Twitter handle of Myntra Fashion Superstar. The entries were open on the Myntra App and Voot.

Influencer Contestants

Summary 

   The contestant won Myntra Fashion Superstar.
  The contestant was the runner-up.
  The contestants were eliminated during the Grand Finale.
 The contestant advanced by receiving Follows from the judges in Episode 1.
  The contestant won the challenge.
  The contestant received positive judges' critiques.
  The contestant was save.
 The contestant received negative judges' critiques.
  The contestant was in the bottom 2.
  The contestant was eliminated.
 The contestant quit the competition

Notes

Season 3 
This season exclusively streamed on OTT platforms - Myntra App and Voot.

Influencer Contestants

Summary 

  The contestant won Myntra Fashion Superstar.
  The contestant was the runner-up.
  The contestants were eliminated during the Grand Finale.
 The contestant received the M Like but wasn't the top performer in the challenge.
  The contestant received the M Like and won the challenge.
  The contestant received positive judges' critiques.
  The contestant was save.
 The contestant received negative judges' critiques.
  The contestant was in the bottom.
  The contestant was eliminated.
 The contestant quit the competition

Notes

Guests

References 

Indian reality television series
Zoom (Indian TV channel) original programming
MTV (Indian TV channel) original programming